The 1993 CSKA season was the club's second season in the newly formed Russian Top League, the highest tier of association football in Russia.

Squad

Transfers

In:

Out:

Competitions

Top League

Results by round

Results

League table

Russian Cup

1992-93

1993-94

The Quarterfinal took place during the 1994 season.

UEFA Champions League

Group stage

Squad statistics

Appearances and goals

|-
|colspan="14"|Players who left CSKA Moscow during the season:

|}

Goal Scorers

Disciplinary record

References

PFC CSKA Moscow seasons
CSKA Moscow